Andrew Drummond may refer to:

 Andrew Drummond (artist), New Zealand painter and sculptor
 Andrew Drummond (author), Scottish translator and novelist
 Andrew Drummond (banker), Scottish founder of the Drummond Bank in Charing Cross, London
 Andrew L. Drummond, chief of the US Secret Service